Riverside University High School is a public high school located on the East Side of Milwaukee, Wisconsin, with a college preparatory curriculum.  It is a part of the Milwaukee Public Schools system.

History

Pre-1912 
Starting in the early 1850s the newly established city of Milwaukee debated establishing a public high school. As early as 1860, Milwaukee had a high school program in the attic of an elementary school in the Brady St. area. The school was at a Jefferson St. location in its founding year of 1868. After several fires and increasing enrollment, East Division High School, also known as East Side High School, opened in the late 1880s. By 1906 ground was broken for a state-of-the-art building at 1615 E. Locust St. (East Locust Street was known at the time as Folsom Place.)  Using then modern technology, the architect increased the window size by using a steel frame designed to bear the weight of the building. This also allowed for less restrictive and cheaper construction. This new design attracted local residents as well as residents in surrounding areas. The design was that of a four-story U-shaped building with a three-story square building inside. The buildings were connected via five skywalks on the second, "main", floor for access to the auditorium and two stairwells to access either basement level gym, nicknamed "the dungeon." The dungeon is now home to the liberal arts and theater department.  This room is used for rehearsal purposes as well as final dress rehearsals. Many of the buildings around the school were inspired by the English Renaissance, Jacobethan, Collegiate Gothic facade of the school.

1912–1945

The new building, dubbed Riverside High School, opened for classes in the fall of 1915. The school was also known as East Division High School until the mid-1980s. East Division was a typical early 20th century high school with a mostly Caucasian student population. The population was segregated at the time because many local residents on the east side of Milwaukee only attended. It was considered the neighborhood school.

Until 1941 Riverside did not have a school cafeteria and lacked a full library. Riverside then received a renovation and a three-story addition that added a third gym and a full cafeteria to the rear of the building, turning the U shape of the school into a square on all but the fourth floor. The third gym was originally intended to be a new pool, but cost and a looming war made a new pool impractical.

1945–1960s
Riverside celebrated its centennial in 1968, "one hundred years ... since it opened its doors on Jefferson St."

Academic departments at the time of the centennial were English, Mathematics, Physical Science (general science, biology, chemistry, physics), Social Science (geography, sociology, economics, history), Foreign Language (French, Latin, Spanish, German), Business Education (typing, shorthand, business law, salesmanship, data processing), Industrial Arts (mechanical drawing, metalwork, machinery), Home Economics, Music, Art, and Physical Education.

Extracurricular activities then included the Student Council (which began as the Student Board in 1925); the Mercury yearbook (the name also used at East in 1892 for the first student newspaper in Milwaukee, which later became a magazine); the Riverside Rocket student newspaper (which started publication in 1955); musical groups – the Senior Band, the orchestra, five singing groups, as well as the largest drill team in the state (the Rockettes, organized in 1954); other fine-arts clubs and activities – Cue Club (drama, started 1916), Cumudeama (CUlture MUsic DEbate drAMA, 1963), Camera Club (1966), a separate Debate Club (1967), as well as the Junior–Senior play (which was performed as early as 1911); clubs dedicated to the relevant culture of each of the four foreign languages offered; the American Field Service (which started locally in 1958); one or two science clubs; the Social Science Club (established 1963); Camaraderie, a girls' social club (begun 1908); Home Economics Club (started as Household Arts in 1919, renamed in 1945); the vocational clubs Future Business Leaders of America and Future Teachers of America (FTA originating in 1958); athletic clubs, activities, and teams – Pep Club (in its sixth year in 1968), Cheerleaders, Girls Athletic Association. Boys' sports were (in the fall) football, cross country; (winter) basketball, swimming, gymnastics, wrestling; (spring) tennis, golf, baseball, and track.

1970s
By the 1970s Riverside High school, like many older urban schools, was in a state of rapid decay. The windows leaked water and snow, and the building's heating system was unable to keep the staff and students warm. Nearly all aspects of the building were in disrepair. It was decided that a second addition and a renovation were in order. After a careful review, the building was retrofitted with new Plexiglass windows. Unfortunately the new windows yellowed over time and blocked much of the sunlight, as well as covered most of the window frame.

In 1978 a new building was added next to Riverside that included a six-lane 25-yard pool, a gym larger than both the original gyms combined, two auto shops, a foundry room, two metal shops, a drivers' education room, a fitness center, and more general classroom space. This extra space allowed the third floor cafeteria to be converted into a large library with three special media centers, while the basement level gym was turned into a cafeteria. The new addition created several dead spaces rarely seen, including the old gym seating behind a wall on the first floor near the rear hallway, and the staircases. The staircases run from the first floor to the fourth floor and are located between the old building and the new building elevator. The new building made Riverside compatible with the Americans with Disabilities Act of 1990 by adding street level and basement level ramps, as well as adding a second elevator; the original elevator is now used primarily as a service elevator. It was one of the first schools in Milwaukee to do so. The addition also added three open "commons" areas, the Cafeteria Commons, the Pool Commons and the Leonard Commons (named after Larry Leonard, a former assistant principal, coach, and special ed teacher who passed in 2003), often used for gatherings.

1980s to 2000s
Along with several other schools in Milwaukee, the 1980s saw major curriculum changes for Riverside. Advanced Placement classes were added and the school was rededicated as Riverside University High School. The nicknames "East Division" and "East Side" were dropped from the daily lexicon. With its new partnership with the University of Wisconsin–Milwaukee, Riverside had transformed itself from a decaying urban school into one of the best AP based high schools in the nation.  Along with Rufus King International School – High School Campus, Milwaukee High School of the Arts, and Milwaukee School of Languages, Riverside is considered one of the best high schools in the city. In recent years Riverside has made Newsweek's list of the best high schools in America. (2008-2010)

In 1997 the single sheet "Tiger Times" was revamped as a full sized school paper, "Word on the River." During the 2000s the curriculum was altered to add more focus on technology. Several rooms were converted to computer labs and the Anzivino Computer Lab was added. In 2008, the school began renovating the Leonard commons by adding square-wooden seats, carpeting, and two flat screen televisions often displaying photos of the school, different events, art work, and information.

In 2021, Riverside adopted a controversial phone policy, which requires that students' phones be collected in the morning, and only be given back to them at the end of the day. This sparked outrage amongst the student population and angered some parents and led to a petition and a protest. Despite these efforts, the phone policy was not overturned

Athletics
Riverside has won sixteen Wisconsin Interscholastic Athletic Association state championships in boys' cross country (1913–20, 1923–28, 1933, 1935-36), claiming the inaugural meet in 1913 as well as the most in state history.

Performing arts
RUHS formerly had a competitive show choir between 1996 and 2004.

Notable alumni

 J. C. Banks, American soccer player
 Fritz Breidster, American football player and Major General U.S. Army
 Brandon Brooks, American football guard, Philadelphia Eagles 
 Frederick W. Cords, Jr., electrical engineer and state legislator
 Colleen Dewhurst, Canadian-American actress
 Terence T. Evans, U.S. Appeals Court Judge for the Seventh Circuit
 Thomas E. Fairchild, U.S. Appeals Court Judge for the Seventh Circuit, U.S. Attorney, 31st Attorney General of Wisconsin
 James W. Higgins, Wisconsin politician and businessman
 Tony Knap, college football head coach
 Alvin Kraenzlein, Olympic athlete
 E. James Ladwig, Wisconsin State Assemblyman
 Thomas J. Mahon, Wisconsin State Assemblyman and Milwaukee County judge
 Lester J. Maitland, aviation pioneer, career officer in the United States Army Air Forces, and Episcopal minister
 Ronald G. Parys, Wisconsin State Senator
 Rudolph T. Randa, United States District Judge for the Eastern District of Wisconsin
 Antonio R. Riley, Midwest Regional Administrator of the U.S. Department of Housing and Urban Development
 John Romano, physician and psychiatrist
 Michael Schultz, film, television, and theater director
 Dave Schulz, politician, County Executive of Milwaukee County, Wisconsin from 1988 to 1992
 Nile Soik, politician, educator
 Gerald Walker, rapper
 Elmer Winter, co-founder of Fortune 500 company ManpowerGroup and lawyer

References

Sources

External links
 Riverside University High School

High schools in Milwaukee
Educational institutions established in 1912
1912 establishments in Wisconsin